The CN&L Subdivision is a railroad line owned and operated by CSX Transportation in the U.S. state of South Carolina. The line runs from Columbia northwest to north of Laurens along the former Columbia, Newberry and Laurens Railroad.

At its southeast end, the CN&L connects to the Hamlet Subdivision, Eastover Subdivision, and Columbia Subdivision. It has a gap near Clinton, where it uses the Monroe Subdivision, and ends at the Spartanburg Subdivision north of Laurens. The CN&L connection track north of Laurens opened in late July 1996, allowing CSX to easily route Florida-bound trains around downtown Laurens and onto the CN&L.

References

CSX Transportation lines
Rail infrastructure in South Carolina
Atlantic Coast Line Railroad